Mikko Lahtela (born October 19, 1992) is a Finnish ice hockey player. He is currently playing with Lahti Pelicans in the Finnish Liiga.

Lahtela made his Liiga debut playing with Lahti Pelicans during the 2014–15 Liiga season.

References

External links

1992 births
Living people
Finnish ice hockey forwards
Lahti Pelicans players
Sportspeople from Lahti